Civil Oversight Council of the National Anti-corruption Bureau of Ukraine (COC NABU) is an independent civil institution, formed according to the National Anti-corruption Bureau of Ukraine Act to ensure the Bureau's transparency, to set public control of its work, and to strengthen its public communications.

The history of COC NABU 
On October 14th, 2014, the President of Ukraine Petro Poroshenko had signed the National Anti-corruption Bureau of Ukraine Act, which included creating the COC.

Signed by the President of Ukraine, the Regulation of COC NABU's work states the goals of the institution:
 Conducting hearings of the information about the actions and the execution of the plans and objectives of the Bureau;
 reviewing the Bureau's reports and forming their conclusions on them;
 choosing two of the COCs members to join the Disciplinary Committee of NABU;
 and other rights, stated in the Regulation.

Current member of the COC (2020—2021) 

The incumbent Head of the PCC is Mark Savchuk, representing PA «Anti-corruption Axe».

Anti-corruption Axe (until February 2021 — «Democratic Axe of the Horde») an anti-corruption public organisation formed in Kyiv in 2018.

Since June 6th, 2018, the organisation members are in the COC, controlling the actions of the National Anti-corruption Bureau of Ukraine and ensuring Bureau’s non-involvement in corruption schemes.

See also

 
 
 
 
 
 Accounting Chamber (Ukraine)

References

2014 establishments in Ukraine
Anti-corruption agencies
Corruption in Ukraine